The 2012 ACC Championship Game was the eighth football championship game for the Atlantic Coast Conference.  It featured the winners of the ACCs two divisions, the Atlantic Division's Florida State Seminoles and the Coastal Division's Georgia Tech Yellow Jackets.  With three teams tied for the first place in the Coastal Division, only Georgia Tech was eligible for the Championship Game.  Miami self-imposed a postseason ban in a bid to lessen possible NCAA sanctions (see 2011 University of Miami athletics scandal). North Carolina was serving a one-year bowl ban handed down by the NCAA as part of the University of North Carolina at Chapel Hill football scandal.

This was the game's third consecutive year at Bank of America Stadium in Charlotte, North Carolina.

References 

ACC Championship
ACC Championship Game
Florida State Seminoles football games
Georgia Tech Yellow Jackets football games
December 2012 sports events in the United States
ACC Championship